Lagman may refer to:

 A lawspeaker
 Lagman (surname)
 Lagemann (surname)
 Lagmann Godredsson
Lagmann mac Gofraid (fl. early eleventh century), King of the Isles
Lǫgmaðr Guðrøðarson (fl. late eleventh century), King of the Isles
 Laghman (food), a spicy Central Asia noodle soup

See also 
 Laghman (disambiguation)